Centruroides is a genus of scorpions of the family Buthidae. Several North American species are known by the common vernacular name bark scorpion. Numerous species are extensively found throughout the southern United States, Mexico, Central America, the Antilles and northern South America. Some are known for their interesting patterning or large size (among Buthidae); most if not all fluoresce strongly under ultraviolet illumination, except after moulting. They contain several highly venomous species, and fatalities are known to occur. The venom of the Mexican scorpion Centruroides limpidus limpidus contains the neurotoxins Cll1 and Cll2.

Taxonomy
The number of species accepted as valid may vary, depending on the authority. The genus is highly speciose, containing at least 100 species:

 Centruroides alayoni Armas, 1999
 Centruroides altagraciae Teruel, de Armas & Kovarik, 2015
 Centruroides anchorellus Armas, 1976
 Centruroides arctimanus Armas, 1976
 Centruroides baergi Hoffmann, 1932
 Centruroides balsasensis Ponce & Francke, 2004
 Centruroides bani Armas & Marcano Fondeur, 1987
 Centruroides baracoae Armas, 1976
 Centruroides barbudensis (Pocock, 1898)
 Centruroides berstoni Goodman, Prendini, Francke & Esposito, 2021
 Centruroides bertholdii (Thorell, 1876)
 Centruroides bicolor (Pocock, 1898)
 Centruroides bonito Quijano-Ravell, Teruel & Ponce-Saavedra, 2016
 Centruroides caral Armas & Trujillo, 2013
 Centruroides caribbeanus Teruel & Myers, 2017
 Centruroides chamela Ponce-Saavedra & Francke, 2011
 Centruroides chamulaensis Hoffmann, 1932
 Centruroides catemacoensis Goodman, Prendini, Francke & Esposito, 2021
 Centruroides chanae Goodman, Prendini, Francke & Esposito, 2021
 Centruroides chiapanensis Hoffmann, 1932
 Centruroides concordia Armas & Teruel, 2021
 Centruroides cuauhmapan Goodman, Prendini, Francke & Esposito, 2021
 Centruroides edwardsii (Gervais, 1843)
 Centruroides elegans (Thorell, 1876)
 Centruroides exilicauda (Wood, 1863)
 Centruroides exilimanus Teruel & Stockwell, 2002
 Centruroides exsul (Meise, 1933)
 Centruroides fallassisimus Armas & Trujillo, 2010
 Centruroides farri Armas, 1976
 Centruroides flavopictus (Pocock, 1898)
 Centruroides franckei Santibanez-Lopez & Contreras-Felix, 2013
 Centruroides fulvipes (Pocock, 1898)
 Centruroides galano Teruel, 2001
 Centruroides gracilis (Latreille, 1804)
 Centruroides granosus (Thorell, 1876)
 Centruroides griseus (C. L. Koch, 1844)
 Centruroides guanensis Franganillo, 1930
 Centruroides hamadryas Goodman, Prendini, Francke & Esposito, 2021
 Centruroides hentzi (Banks, 1900)
 Centruroides hirsuticauda Teruel, 2011
 Centruroides hirsutipalpus Ponce-Saavedra & Francke, 2009
 Centruroides hoffmanni Armas, 1996
 Centruroides huichol Teruel, Ponce-Saavedra & Quijano-Ravell, 2015
 Centruroides infamatus (C. L. Koch, 1844)
 Centruroides insulanus (Thorell, 1876)
 Centruroides ixil Trujillo & Armas, 2016
 Centruroides jaragua Armas, 1999
 Centruroides jorgeorum Santiago-Blay, 2009
 Centruroides koesteri Kraepelin, 1912
 Centruroides lauriadnae Ponce-Saavedra & Francke, 2019
 Centruroides limbatus (Pocock, 1898)  
 Centruroides limpidus (Karsch, 1879)
 Centruroides luceorum Armas, 1999
 Centruroides lucidus Teruel, Armas & Kovarik, 2015
 Centruroides marcanoi Armas, 1981
 Centruroides margaritatus (Gervais, 1841)
 Centruroides mascota Ponce-Saavedra & Francke, 2011
 Centruroides meisei Hoffmann, 1939
 Centruroides melanodactylus Teruel, 2001
 Centruroides navarroi Teruel, 2001
 Centruroides nigrescens (Pocock, 1898)
 Centruroides nigrimanus (Pocock, 1898)
 Centruroides nigropunctatus Teruel, 2006
 Centruroides nigrovariatus (Pocock, 1898)
 Centruroides nitidus (Thorell, 1876)
 Centruroides noxius Hoffmann, 1932
 Centruroides ochraceus (Pocock, 1898)
 Centruroides orizaba Armas & Martin-Frias, 2003
 Centruroides ornatus Pocock, 1902
 Centruroides pallidiceps Pocock, 1902
 Centruroides panamensis Arias & Esposito, 2014
 Centruroides platnicki Armas, 1981
 Centruroides pococki Sissom & Francke, 1983
 Centruroides polito Teruel, 2007
 Centruroides poncei Teruel, Kovarik, Baldazo-Monsivais & Hoferek, 2015
 Centruroides possanii Gonzalez-Santillan, Galan-Sanchez & Valdez-Velazquez, 2019
 Centruroides rileyi Sissom, 1995
 Centruroides robertoi Armas, 1976
 Centruroides rodolfoi Santibanez-Lopez & Contreras-Felix, 2013
 Centruroides romeroi Quijano-Ravell, De Armas, Francke & Ponce-Saavedra, 2019
 Centruroides ruana Quijano-Ravell & Ponce-Saavedra, 2016
 Centruroides sanandres Armas, Sarmiento & Florez, 2012
 Centruroides sasae Santiago-Blay, 2009
 Centruroides schmidti Sissom, 1995
 Centruroides sculpturatus Ewing, 1928
 Centruroides serrano Santibanez-Lopez & Ponce-Saavedra, 2009
 Centruroides simplex (Thorell, 1876)
 Centruroides sissomi Armas, 1996
 Centruroides spectatus Teruel, 2006
 Centruroides stockwelli Teruel, 2001
 Centruroides suffusus (Pocock, 1902)
 Centruroides tapachulaensis Hoffmann, 1932
 Centruroides tecomanus Hoffmann, 1932
 Centruroides tenuis Thorell, 1876
 Centruroides testaceus (DeGeer, 1778)
 Centruroides thorellii (Kraepelin, 1891)
 Centruroides tuxtla Armas, 1999
 Centruroides underwoodi Armas, 1976
 Centruroides villegasi Baldazo-Monsivaiz, Ponce-Saavedra & Flores-Moreno, 2013
 Centruroides vittatus (Say, 1821)
 Centruroides yucatanensis Goodman, Prendini, Francke & Esposito, 2021

References 

 
Scorpions of South America